The Bezirk Halle was a district (Bezirk) of East Germany. The administrative seat and the main town was Halle.

History
The district was established, with the other 13, on 25 July 1952, substituting the old German states. After 3 October 1990 it was disestablished as a consequence of the German reunification, becoming again part of the state of Saxony-Anhalt except Artern kreis, which became part of Thuringia.

Geography

Position
The Bezirk Halle bordered with the Bezirke of Magdeburg, Potsdam, Cottbus, Leipzig, Gera and Erfurt.

Subdivision
The Bezirk was divided into 23 Kreise: 3 urban districts (Stadtkreise) and 20 rural districts (Landkreise): 
Urban districts : Dessau; Halle; Halle-Neustadt.
Rural districts : Artern; Aschersleben; Bernburg; Bitterfeld; Eisleben; Gräfenhainichen; Hettstedt; Hohenmölsen; Köthen; Merseburg; Naumburg; Nebra; Quedlinburg; Querfurt; Roßlau; Saalkreis; Sangerhausen; Weißenfels; Wittenberg; Zeitz.

See also
Regierungsbezirk Halle
Regierungsbezirk Dessau

References

External links

Halle
Former states and territories of Saxony-Anhalt
20th century in Saxony-Anhalt
Halle (Saale)